Tony Randall Pollard (born April 30, 1997) is an American football running back for the Dallas Cowboys of the National Football League (NFL). He played college football at Memphis, and was drafted by the Cowboys in the fourth round of the 2019 NFL Draft.

Early years 
Pollard attended Melrose High School, where he played high school football. As a senior, he was a two-way starter at wide receiver and cornerback on the high school football team. He helped the team reach the playoffs, while making over 1,200 receiving yards, 20 touchdowns and being named All-District 16-AAA.

College career 
Pollard accepted a football scholarship from the University of Memphis. As a redshirt freshman, he appeared in 13 games, of which he started seven. He registered 29 receptions for 298 yards (10.3-yard avg.), 31 carries for 159 yards (5.1-yard avg.) and three touchdowns. He finished among the national leaders in kickoff return average (28.1 yards). He had two returns for touchdown and was named the American Athletic Conference's Special Teams Player of the Year.

As a sophomore, he posted 36 receptions for 536 yards (14.9-yard avg.) and 30 carries for 230 yards (7.7-yard avg.) and six touchdowns. He led the nation with a school-record 40-yard average per kickoff return (22 for 881 yards) and four returns for touchdowns. He repeated as the American Athletic Conference's Special Teams Player of the Year.

As a junior, even though he shared the backfield with Darrell Henderson, he totaled 78 carries for 552 yards (7.1-yard avg.), 39 receptions for 458 yards (11.7-yard avg.), ten touchdowns with one kickoff return for a touchdown. In the 2018 Birmingham Bowl against Wake Forest, he recorded 318 all-purpose yards (209 on kickoff returns) and one rushing touchdown.
 
Pollard was considered one of the best kickoff return specialists in college football, tying a FBS record with seven career kick-return touchdowns, 87 kickoff returns (second in school history), 2,616 kickoff return yards (second in school history), 30.1 kick-return average (school record) and 4,680 all-purpose yards (second in school history).

On January 11, 2019, Pollard declared for the 2019 NFL Draft. Just six days later, on January 17, 2019, Pollard was added to the 2019 North Senior Bowl roster.

Statistics

Professional career 

Pollard was selected by the Dallas Cowboys in the fourth round (128th overall) in the 2019 NFL Draft.

2019 season 
He had 13 carries for 24 yards in his NFL debut in Week 1  against the New York Giants in the 35–17 victory. During Week 3 against the Miami Dolphins, Pollard posted his first career 100+-yard game as he finished with 103 rushing yards on 13 carries and a touchdown as the Cowboys won 31–6. During Week 15 against the Los Angeles Rams, Pollard finished with 131 rushing yards on 12 attempts, including a 44-yard touchdown as the Cowboys won 44–21. Overall, in his rookie season, he finished with 86 carries for 455 rushing yards and two rushing touchdowns to go along with 15 receptions for 107 receiving yards and one receiving touchdown.

2020 season 
Pollard continued his role as a backup to Ezekiel Elliott to go along with some kickoff return duties in the 2020 season. In Week 15 against the San Francisco 49ers, Pollard recorded 132 yards from scrimmage and two rushing touchdowns during the 41–33 win. Overall, he appeared in all 16 games, of which he started two, in the 2020 season. He finished with 101 carries for 435 rushing yards and four rushing touchdowns to go along with 28 receptions for 193 receiving yards and one receiving touchdown.

2021 season 

In Week 2, against the Los Angeles Chargers, Pollard totaled 137 scrimmage yards in the 20–17 victory. In Week 5, against the New York Giants, Pollard totaled 103 scrimmage yards in the 44–20 victory.

2022 season 
In Week 5, against the Los Angeles Rams, Pollard had a 57-yard rushing touchdown. In Week 8, against Chicago, Pollard had 13 carries for 141 yards and three rushing touchdowns in the 49−29 win, and was named Ground Player of the Week. In Week 11, Pollard had 80 rushing yards, and six catches for 109 yards and two touchdowns in a 40-3 win over the Vikings, earning NFC Offensive Player of the Week. During the 2022-23 NFC divisional playoff game against the San Francisco 49ers, Pollard suffered a high ankle sprain and fractured fibula in the second quarter when 49ers defensive back Jimmie Ward landed on his ankle while making the tackle. Pollard was carted to the X-ray room with an air cast on his leg. Pollard underwent surgery.

2023 season 
On March 6, 2023, the Cowboys placed the franchise tag on Pollard.

NFL career statistics

References

External links 
 Dallas Cowboys bio
 Memphis Tigers bio

1997 births
Living people
Players of American football from Memphis, Tennessee
American football return specialists
American football running backs
Memphis Tigers football players
Dallas Cowboys players
National Conference Pro Bowl players